Pazzano is a village and comune located in Locride's region in the province of Reggio Calabria (Calabria, southern Italy).

History 

The first known mention of Pazzano dates to a 1094 document. The town was founded as a minerary center for the exploitation of iron (by pyrite and limonite) and molybdenum (the latter in caves of Monte Stella and Monte Consolino) deposits. During the period of the Kingdom of the Two Sicilies, its 25 mines made Pazzano the most important mining centre in all of southern Italy. The minerals were processed at Reali ferriere ed Officine di Mongiana in Mongiana.

Pazzano became a comune in 1811. Minerary activities lasted until the 20th century. During the 1950s, the inhabitants began to emigrate to northern Italy, and Pazzano's population drastically reduced.

At Sydney,(Australia), since the 1950s the emigrants of Pazzano created a little Community in Brookvale (nicknamed Pazzaniedu) and at Narraweena, every year take place the Santo Salvatore's fiest.

There is also a little community at Aliquippa in Pennsylvania (USA).

By the 1980s the ecomuseum Ecomuseo delle ferriere e fonderie di Calabria (Ecomuseum of iron-foundry and foundry of Calabria) was to preserve and remember the industrial archaeology of the town.

Main sights 

 Chiesa di Santa Maria Assunta in Cielo (Santa Maria's church)
 Santuario di Monte Stella (Monte Stella's Sanctuary)
 The 25 old iron mines of Borbonic period, now closed:

Principe Ereditario (Settecento)
Carolina (Settecento)
S. Ferdinando (Settecento)
Regina
Noceto
Scolo
Galleria Italia
Galleria Piave
Galleria Acqua Calda
Contrì
San Giuseppe
R. Principe
Colle di Banno
Lucarello
S. Maria
Perrone
Gotto
perronello
Clementina
Clementina II
San Carlo
San Nicola
Campoli
Garibaldi
San Luigi
Grotta Nuova
Provvisoria
Regina ribasso
Melichicchi
Umberto I

 Fontana Vecchia or Fontana dei minatori (Old Fountain or Miner's Fountain)

People 
Giuseppe Coniglio (2 December 1922 – 13 March 2006), poet. He wrote  Calabria contadina (poetry, 1973), Quattru chjacchjari e ddui arrisi (poetry, 1984), A terra mia (poetry, 1998) and Marcu e Filomena (theatrical comedy)

Economy 

In the past Pazzano had an industrial activity related with Reali Ferriere di Mongiana, people who worked in the field in spring and summer period on winter worked in the iron mines.
The subsistence agriculture produced olive oil, wine, grain, cheese, vegetables like eggplants, tomatoes, chicory, zucchini, beans, chickpeas, fruit like oranges, figs, and pears.
There were also limestone quarries, hydraulic mills, and a homemade of dress production. 
 
The 1960s was also the period when emigration to Italian northern cities and year by year numerous economical activities closed.
 
The economy of Pazzano now is largely based on agriculture: olive oil production, fruit harvesting, and religious tourism.
In the early 21st century, there have been some attempts in Vallata dello Stilaro and Serre calabresi to increase natural tourism with the creation of the near Parco naturale regionale delle Serre (Serre's park) and archaeological industrial tourism with the ecomuseum creation of Ecomuseo delle ferriere e fonderie di Calabria and the building of Museo della cultura mineraria (mine culture museum) in Pazzano.

Transportation 
Pazzano is located on the SS 110 state road,  from the coastal town of Monasterace Marina.

There is a bus service, Federico, that links Pazzano with Reggio Calabria and several other towns including Stilo, Caulonia, Gioiosa Ionica and Locri. The nearest railway station is Monasterace Marina (15 km).

Food 

Pazzano's food is typical of Calabria, and includes:

Pasta e casa (Home made pasta).
Ragù cooked with goat meat.
Tripe ('trippa') and potatoes
Melanzane ('malangiani') ripiene (stuffed aubergine/egg-plant)
'Pipi Chini' (stuffed capsicum)
Zippuli
Pitta di San Martino, San Martino's day (11 November) typical sweet 
cuzzupe, Easter typical sweet

See also 

Vallata dello Stilaro
Ecomuseo delle ferriere e fonderie di Calabria
Andata e ritorno
Monte Consolino
Monte Mammicomito
Monte Stella (Calabria)
Eremo di Santa Maria della Stella

References

External links 

New site of  Comune di Pazzano (2006)
Circolo ricreativo culturale giovanile pazzanese
Pazzano's history   
Comunità montana Stilaro Allaro
Dialetto - 'u tripu da cona' on YouTube
Cunfrunti1 (Feast of Saint Salvatore)on YouTube
Cunfrunti2 (Feast of Saint Salvatore)on YouTube
Pazzanese proverb - YouTube

Cities and towns in Calabria
Vallata dello Stilaro
Articles containing video clips